The Nevada State Controller is a constitutional officer in the executive branch of government of the U.S. state of Nevada. Twenty-two individuals have held the office of State Controller since statehood. The incumbent is Andy Matthews, a Republican.

Powers and duties
The State Controller is the chief fiscal officer of the state of Nevada and is responsible for administering the state’s accounting system, registering vendors, settling all claims against the state and collecting debts owed to the state. With respects to accounting, the State Controller processes and records the state’s financial transactions, selects a certified public accounting firm to conduct the annual statewide single audit of the state's financial statements and federal awards, ensures compliance with constitutional, statutory and regulatory internal controls, and recommends plans to the Legislature for the support of the public credit, to promote frugality and efficiency within state government operations, and better manage the state's cash flow. The State Controller also provides citizens, state agencies, local governments and legislators with accurate and impartial information on Nevada's financial condition, issues reports on the quarterly revenues, expenditures, and balances of the state's Permanent School Fund, and protects state funds by ensuring that they are properly accounted for and spent in the most efficient and cost effective manner at all times.

Moreover, the State Controller is a member of the State Board of Finance, the Executive Branch Audit Committee, and the Board of Directors of the Department of Transportation. These boards respectively approve and periodically review the State Treasurer's investment policies for both the State Investment Fund and the assets held in the Local Government Pooled Investment Fund; approve the annual internal audit plan of the Office of Finance and reviews final audit reports; and direct the financial administration of the Nevada Department of Transportation.

List of state controllers

References

External links
 Nevada State Controller's Office

 
Nevada